The 2015 UCI Para-cycling Road World Championships were the World Championships for road cycling for athletes with a physical disability. The Championships took place on the roads of Nottwil in Switzerland from 29 July to 2 August 2015. Italy were the most successful team of the competition in number of gold medals won (9), while Germany finished with the greatest total of medals (21).

Classification

Sport class
Cycling
C1 - locomotor disability: Neurological, or amputation
C2 - Locomotor disability: Neurological, decrease in muscle strength, or amputation
C3 - Locomotor disability: Neurological, or amputation
C4 - Locomotor disability: Neurological, or amputation
C5 - Locomotor disability: Neurological, or amputation
Hand cycling 
H1 - tetraplegics with severe upper limb impairment to the C6 vertebra
H2 - Tetraplegics with minor upper limb impairment from C7 thru T3
H3 - paraplegics with impairment from T4 thru T10
H4 - Paraplegics with impairment from T11 down, and amputees unable to kneel
H5 - Athletes who can kneel on a handcycle, a category that includes paraplegics and amputees
Tricycle
T1 - Severe locomotor dysfunction
T2 - Moderate loss of stability and function
Tandem
Tandem B - Visual impairment

Event winners

Medal table

Participating nations
32 nations participated.

References

External links
Official Results Book

UCI Para-cycling Track World Championships
UCI Para-cycling Track World Championships
International cycle races hosted by Switzerland
UCI Para-cycling Track World Championships